Protostyela is a genus of ascidian tunicates in the family Styelidae.

Species within the genus Protostyela include:
 Protostyela heterobranchia Millar, 1954 
 Protostyela longicauda Monniot, Vazquez, White, 1995

References

Stolidobranchia
Tunicate genera